Reido is a Belarusian doom metal band.

Biography 

Reido was founded in 2002 in Minsk by Alexander Kachar and Anton Matveev. They've been permanent members of the band until now. In May 2006, the first Reido full-length album F:\all was released by Solitude Productions label. In October 2006, Reido released a single named Detect Memory, which was available for free download. In November 2011, the second Reido full-length album Minus Eleven (or -11) was released by Sow Burn Records. In October 2019, the third full-length album "Anātman" was released on Aesthetic Death.

Current members 
 Alexander Kachar – guitar, vocals, bass, synthesizer
 Anton Matveev – guitar, synthesizer, sound engineering
 Dmitry Kochkin – drums

Discography

Studio albums 
F:\all (2006, Solitude Productions)
Minus Eleven (2011, Slow Burn Records)
Anātman (2019, Aesthetic Death)

Singles 
 "Detect Memory" (2006)

Videos 
 Zero Level Activity (2006)

External links 

Reido on doom-metal.com
Reido on Metal-archives
Interview with Reido on Metallibrary 

Funeral doom musical groups
Belarusian heavy metal musical groups
Musical groups established in 2002
2002 establishments in Belarus